Snowy Range Ski and Recreation Area is a small ski area in southeastern Wyoming, located about five miles from the town of Centennial in Medicine Bow National Forest. At 32 miles away, it is the closest ski area to Laramie, home of the University of Wyoming.

External links

Ski areas and resorts in Wyoming
Buildings and structures in Albany County, Wyoming
Tourist attractions in Albany County, Wyoming